This page shows the progress of Gillingham in the 2011–12 season. This season they played their league games in Football League Two, the fourth tier of English football.

League data

League table

Results summary

Results

Pre-season friendlies

League Two

FA Cup

League Cup

Football League Trophy

Squad statistics

Appearances and goals

|-
|colspan="14"|Players featured for club who have left:

|}

Top scorers

Awards

Transfers

References 

Gillingham F.C. seasons
Gillingham
2010s in Kent